Brdce is a small settlement in the Municipality of Vojnik in eastern Slovenia. The area is part of the traditional region of Styria. It is now included with the rest of the municipality in the Savinja Statistical Region.

A small roadside chapel-shrine in the village dates to the late 19th century.

References

External links
Brdce at Geopedia

Populated places in the Municipality of Vojnik